Prabir Das (born 20 December 1993) is an Indian professional footballer who plays as a right-back for Indian Super League club Bengaluru FC.

Career

Pailan Arrows
On 23 September 2012 Das scored his first goal for Pailan Arrows in the 2012 Indian Federation Cup against Shillong Lajong at the Keenan Stadium in the 69th minute to give Pailan the victory 2–1. He then scored his first I-League goal for Pailan Arrows and the second goal of his career again against Shillong Lajong at the Salt Lake Stadium in which he scored in the 39th minute to give Pailan Arrows the eventual 1–0.

On 12 April 2013, during a game versus Prayag United, Das collapsed on the pitch due to heatstroke. It was 37 degrees Celsius when Das fell and had to be taken away via ambulance to the nearest hospital. He had breathing problems which resulted in immediate care.

Dempo
On 15 November 2013, Das joined Goan giant Dempo SC from Pailan Arrows for a one-year deal on loan. 
He made his debut for Dempo in the I-League on 27 November 2013 against Pune F.C. at the Duler Stadium in which he played the whole match as Dempo drew the match 1-1.

Mohun Bagan
On 13 June 2015 Das signed a two-year contract with Mohun Bagan.

Delhi Dynamos (loan)
In July 2015 Das was drafted to play for Delhi Dynamos in the 2015 Indian Super League.

ATK (loan)
In July 2016, Das signed for former ISL champion Atletico de Kolkata on loan from Mohun Bagan. He was the instrumental part of ATK squad which lifted the 2016 ISL trophy.

ATK
On 5 July 2017, Das has been retained by two times ISL Champions ATK on a three-year contract.

International

India U19
Das made his debut for the India U19s on 31 October 2011 during the 2012 AFC U-19 Championship qualifiers against Turkmenistan in which he also scored in the 82nd minute to confirm India's 3–1 victory to open the qualifiers.

India U23
On 29 March 2015, Das has made his debut for India U23 against Syria in AFC U23 Championship Qualifier.

Personal life
In December 2019, he extended financial support for a young East Bengal fan's treatment.

He has been in relationship with Indian Bengali actress Geetashree Roy.

Career statistics

Club

Honours

Club
Mohun Bagan
 I-League: 2014–15
 Federation Cup: 2015–16

ATK
 Indian Super League: 2016, 2019–20

Bengaluru
 Durand Cup: 2022

References

External links 
 

Indian footballers
1993 births
Living people
Footballers from Kolkata
I-League players
Indian Super League players
Indian Arrows players
Dempo SC players
FC Goa players
Mohun Bagan AC players
Odisha FC players
Association football fullbacks
ATK (football club) players
ATK Mohun Bagan FC players
Bengaluru FC players
Calcutta Football League players